Bisharat may refer to:

The Tablets of Bahá'u'lláh Bishárát, part of the scriptures of the Baháʼí Faith
Charlie Bisharat, professional studio and concert violinist
Emily Bisharat (died 2004), Jordanian lawyer, activist and philanthropist